So Morita (守田創, born May 14, 1992) is a Japanese football player.

Club statistics
Updated to 23 February 2018.

References

External links

Profile at J. League

1992 births
Living people
Association football people from Kumamoto Prefecture
Japanese footballers
J1 League players
J2 League players
J3 League players
Sagan Tosu players
Iwate Grulla Morioka players
Tochigi City FC players
Association football defenders